Diff's Lucky Day is an EP by post-grunge band Blyss, the precursor to Lifehouse.

With Ron Aniello as the album's producer, frontman Jason Wade and his band, comprising Sergio Andrande, Jon "Diff" Palmer, Collin Hayden, and Aaron Lord, released their album in 1999 for sale at concerts and distribution among friends or potential industry contacts.

Track listing

Personnel
Jason Wade - lead vocals, rhythm guitar
Sergio Andrade - bass guitar
Jon "Diff" Palmer - drums
Collin Hayden - lead guitar
Aaron Lord - keyboards

References

Lifehouse (band) albums
1999 debut EPs